John Gimlette is an English author of travel literature. He has published five books to date; Panther Soup: A European Journey in War and Peace, Theatre Of Fish: Travels through Newfoundland and Labrador, At The Tomb Of The Inflatable Pig: Travels through Paraguay Wild Coast: Travels on South America's Untamed Edge and Elephant Complex. Jorge Antonio Halke Arévalos is a character in “The Pig”. After the publication he was killed in a dispute in 2005.

Biography
Born in 1963, at the age of 17 Gimlette crossed the former Soviet Union by train, and has now travelled to more than 60 countries.

In addition to his five books, Gimlette has written articles for newspapers and magazines and contributed to BBC travel programmes.

Awards and honors
2012 Dolman Best Travel Book Award, winner, Wild Coast: Travels on South America's Untamed Edge

References

External links 
 Vagabonding - Rolf Potts' interview with John Gimlette.
 New York Times - War Zone revisited, review of Panther Soup: A European Journey in War and Peace.
 Joanna Kavenna, "The frozen, unruly north", review of Theatre Of Fish: Travels through Newfoundland, The Spectator, 26 February 2005.
 salon.com - "The world's best living travel writer", article by Patrick Smith.

1963 births
Living people
English travel writers
English male non-fiction writers